The Evangelical Church of Hesse Electorate-Waldeck (EKKW) is a United Protestant church body in former Hesse-Cassel and the Waldeck part of the former Free State of Waldeck-Pyrmont.

Constitution 
The EKKW is a full member of the Evangelical Church in Germany (EKD) and the Reformed Alliance, and is based on the teachings presented by Martin Luther during the Reformation. Their Bishop is since October 1, 2019 Beate Hofmann. The bishop's preaching venue is the Martinskirche in Kassel. It is a Protestant church united in administration, comprising Lutheran, Reformed (Calvinist), and Protestant union congregations upholding Calvinist (Reformed) and Lutheran traditions. The Evangelical Church of Hesse Electorate-Waldeck is one of 20 churches within the EKD.

Bishops 
 1924–1934: Heinrich Möller
 June–December 1934: Karl Theys
 1935–1945: Friedrich Happich,
 1945–1963: Adolf Wüstemann
 1963–1978: Erich Vellmer
 1978–1991: Hans-Gernot Jung
 1991–1992: Erhard Giesler
 1992–2000: Christian Zippert
 2000–2019: Martin Hein
 2019–: Beate Hofmann

History 
The Evangelical Church of Hesse Electorate-Waldeck was founded in 1934 through a merger of two other formerly independent churches: the Evangelical Church of Electoral Hesse and the Evangelical State Church of Waldeck and Pyrmont (Waldeck part).

Practices 
Ordination of women and blessing of same-sex marriages were allowed.

References

Sources 
 Michael Hederich: Um die Freiheit der Kirche. Geschichte der Evangelischen Kirche von Kurhessen-Waldeck. Evangelischer Presseverband Kurhessen-Waldeck, Kassel 1972 (Monographia Hassiae 1, ISSN 0720-4671).
 Sebastian Parker: Die Marburger Konferenz. Fusionspläne und Zusammenarbeit hessischer evangelischer Landeskirchen im 20. Jahrhundert. Verlag der Hessische Kirchengeschichtlichen Vereinigung, Darmstadt u. a. 2008,  (Quellen und Studien zur hessischen Kirchengeschichte 16), (Zugleich: Darmstadt, Techn. Hochsch., Magisterarbeit, 2004).
 Karl Schilling: Der Zusammenschluss der Landeskirchen Waldeck und Hessen-Kassel. In: Waldeckischer Landeskalender. 2009 (2008), ZDB-ID 513652-0, S. 80–92.
 Dieter Waßmann: Waldeck. Geschichte einer Landeskirche. Evangelischer Presseverband Kurhessen-Waldeck, Kassel 1984,  (Monographia Hassiae 10).

External links 
 Official Website by Evangelical Church of Hesse Electorate-Waldeck

HesseElectorate
HesseElectorate
HesseElectorate
HesseElectorate